Daugava Stadium may refer to:

Daugava Stadium (Riga), Latvia
Daugava Stadium (Daugavpils), Latvia
Daugava Stadium (Liepāja), Latvia

See also
Daugava (disambiguation)